Adrian Bailie Nottage Palmer, 4th Baron Palmer (born 8 October 1951), is an aristocrat and landowner in Scotland. Lord Palmer succeeded his uncle in the peerage in 1990, and is now one of the ninety hereditary peers elected to remain in the House of Lords after the passing of the House of Lords Act 1999; he sits as a crossbencher.

Early life
Palmer is the son of Colonel the Hon. Sir Gordon Palmer, a younger son of Ernest Palmer, 2nd Baron Palmer by his marriage to Lorna Eveline Hope Bailie.

He was educated at Eton and the University of Edinburgh, where he received a Certificate in Farming Practice.

Career
Palmer was an apprentice at his family's biscuit factory, Huntley and Palmers Ltd, in Reading, and then worked as sales manager in Belgium and Luxembourg, between 1974 and 1977.

From 1977 to 1986 he was the Scottish representative to the European Landowners' Organisation (ELO). He was member of the Executive Council of the Historic Houses Association from 1981 to 1999, and of the council of the Scottish Landowners' Federation from 1986 to 1992. Between 1989 and 2005, he was also secretary of the Royal Caledonian Hunt. For the Historic Houses Association for Scotland, The Lord Palmer was vice-chairman in 1993 and 1994, and chairman between 1994 and 1999.

Palmer was also President of the Palm Tree Silk Company in St Lucia, of the British Association of Biofuels and Oils (BABFO), and of the transport division of the Renewable Energy Authority. He is a member of the National Farmers Union of Scotland and since 1994 chairman of the Country Sports Defence Trust. Between 1990 and 1996, he was a member of the Royal Company of Archers.

Palmer lives at Manderston, Duns, Berwickshire.

Marriages
On 7 May 1977, at Haileybury, Hertfordshire, he married firstly Cornelia Dorothy Katharine Wadham, daughter of R. N. Wadham, of Newmarket. They were divorced in 2004. Together they have three children, two sons and a daughter:

Hon. Hugo Bailie Rohan Palmer (born 1980) – heir apparent to the barony
Hon. Edwina Laura Marguerite Palmer (born 1982)
Hon. George Gordon Nottage Palmer (born 1985)

Palmer married secondly in 2006 Loraine McMurrey, a Houston heiress, and divorced in 2013.

Arms

References

 Black, A.,& C., Who's Who, London, 2004, 156th edition, p. 1679.

External links 
 Lord Palmer - UK Parliament

1951 births
Living people
Alumni of the University of Edinburgh
Barons in the Peerage of the United Kingdom
British trade unionists
People educated at Eton College
Crossbench hereditary peers
Members of the Royal Company of Archers
Hereditary peers elected under the House of Lords Act 1999
Adrian